A House on a Hill is a 2003 American drama film written and directed by Chuck Workman and starring Philip Baker Hall, Laura San Giacomo, Shirley Knight and Henry Rollins.

Plot

Cast
Philip Baker Hall as Harry Mayfield
Laura San Giacomo as Gaby
Shirley Knight as Mercedes Mayfield
Henry Rollins as Arthur
Rebecca Staab as Kate Banks
James Karen as Sy
Domenica Cameron-Scorsese as Jennifer
Jack Conley as Richard Banks
John J. Vogel as Lee Stans

Reception
The film has a 75% rating on Rotten Tomatoes.

References

External links
 
 
 

American drama films
Films directed by Chuck Workman
2003 drama films
2003 films
2000s English-language films
2000s American films